David Ayton Sr. (25 May 1857 – 30 January 1931) was a Scottish professional golfer who played in the late 19th century.  He had three top-10 finishes in the Open Championship. He was the son of William Ayton, one of the eleven founders of St Andrews Golf Club in about 1843.

Early life
Ayton was born on 25 May 1857 in St Andrews, Scotland, to William Ayton, one of the eleven founders of St Andrews Golf Club circa 1843.

Golf career
He was at the peak of his playing form in the 1880s with his best performance, a third place, in the 1885 Open Championship held at the Old Course, St Andrews, Scotland, finishing two strokes behind the winner Bob Martin. He is best remembered for an event that never took place. Various sources (including his obituary in the Dundee Courier) refer to him taking 11 at the "Road hole" (the 17th) but a contemporary newspaper report gives his scores there as 6 and 7. He also had top-10 finishes in the 1882 and 1888 Open Championships.

Family
His sons David Jr., Laurie Sr., George and Alex were all professional golfers, as was his grandson Laurie Jr.

Death and legacy
Ayton died in St Andrews, Scotland, on 30 January 1931.  He is best remembered for a fine third place finish in the 1885 Open Championship and for reputedly taking an 11 on the Road hole (#17) on the Old Course which, in fact, never happened.

Results in The Open Championship

Note: Ayton played only in The Open Championship.

DNP = Did not play
WD = Withdrew
? = Competed, finish unknown
"T" indicates a tie for a place
Yellow background for top-10

References

Scottish male golfers
Golfers from St Andrews
1857 births
1931 deaths